The Magic Castle is a clubhouse for magicians and magic enthusiasts as well as the clubhouse for the Academy of Magical Arts. It is in the Hollywood district of Los Angeles, California, and it bills itself as "the most unusual private club in the world".

Only Magic Castle members and their guests are allowed entrance, although courtesy invitations can be obtained. During a typical evening, there are numerous magic shows and historic displays as well as a full-service dining room and numerous bars. The atmosphere is reminiscent of classic night club days, and a strict dress code is enforced. Once a private residence, the Castle was declared a Los Angeles Historic-Cultural Monument in 1989.

Many celebrities have performed at the Magic Castle, including Orson Welles, Johnny Carson, Steve Martin, and Neil Patrick Harris. One of the Castle's most memorable performers was Dai Vernon, an expert in sleight of hand.

Description 

The Magic Castle is a performance venue, restaurant, and private club. A typical evening features magic and variety arts performances as well as a full-service dining room and several bars in a country-club atmosphere.

The lobby of the Castle has no visible doors to the interior, and visitors must say a secret phrase to a sculpture of an owl to gain access, exposing the entrance to the club. Magicians perform in several theaters, including the intimate Close-up Gallery, a larger Parlour of Prestidigitation, and the large stage in the Palace of Mystery. Nightly, five different magic performances are showcased in these three theaters, and on weekends additional performances are added in the Peller theatre as well as Hat and Hare Pub and W.C. Fields Bar. Informal performance areas near the five bars give magician members the space for impromptu magic for guests and other patrons. In the music room, a piano is played by invisible "Irma", the Castle's "resident ghost", who takes musical requests.

In addition, there are regular Houdini séances at the castle in the Houdini Séance room, conducted by Leo Kostka, Rob Zabrecky, or Misty Lee. The club is said to be haunted by the ghost of Houdini.

Those under 21 years of age are not permitted during evening performances. However, on Saturdays and Sundays, the Castle hosts an "all-ages" brunch and performances which are open to members and their guests, including those under the age of 21. During brunch, the Castle's "Junior Members" (ranging in age from 13 to 20 years old) perform in the Close-up Gallery.

Magic Castle Junior Group 
The Magic Castle is also known for its Junior Program (the Magic Castle Junior Group). The Junior Group comprises highly skilled young magicians, many of whom have gone on to professional careers in magic. One week a year, billed as "Future Stars Week", performers from the Junior Group are showcased in evening performances in the Castle's showrooms.

History 
The Magic Castle is a châteauesque residence built in 1909 by real estate investor, lawyer, banker, newspaper editor, and philanthropist, Rollin B. Lane. The house was designed by architects Lyman Farwell and Oliver Dennis and constructed as a near duplicate of the 1897 Kimberly Crest House and Gardens in Redlands, California, that the architects had designed over a decade earlier. Ownership of the building remained in the Lane family until 1955 when it was sold to Thomas O. Glover. In September 1961, the building was leased to Milt Larsen, Bill Larsen, and Irene Larsen, who began converting it to its present state. The Magic Castle opened for business on January 2, 1963. Over the years several additions have been made to the original structure, allowing for the inclusion of several theaters, bars, a library and other meeting spaces. The Magic Castle was declared a Los Angeles Historic-Cultural Monument in 1989.

One of the Castle's performers was the Dai Vernon, an expert in sleight of hand. Vernon would sit in the bar area entertaining and teaching. Vernon lived at the Castle for many years, up until his death in 1992.

On October 31, 2011, the Magic Castle was damaged in fire that had started in the attic. Interior refurbishing was necessary as a result of water damage and the Magic Castle reopened in February 2012.

In April 2022 the Magic Castle was purchased by Randy Pitchford, the CEO of The Gearbox Entertainment Company and a member of the AMA. Under his ownership, it will remain a magic performance venue and the Academy's clubhouse.

Academy of Magical Arts 

The Academy of Magical Arts is a nonprofit mutual benefit corporation organized and devoted to the promotion and development of the art of magic.

The Academy of Magical Arts was started in 1952 by William Larsen, Sr. as a loose association of magicians, although it was not officially incorporated and its organization formalized until 1962, when Larsen's sons, William Larsen, Jr. and Milt Larsen, built the Academy into an international organization. The Academy's headquarters has been the Magic Castle since 1963.

History 

The Academy of Magical Arts was created by William Larsen and announced in the April 1952 issue of his independent magazine of magic, Genii; of which all the subscribers were automatically accorded membership. "Academy Awards" were presented by Larsen over the next several months for outstanding contributions in various areas of the magic arts. William Larsen, Sr. died at the age of 48 in July 1953. His wife and his eldest son, Bill Jr. continued the publication of the magazine, but the "Academy" lacked any formal structure, and the organization became dormant. In 1962, William Larsen's younger son, Milt, undertook the job of leasing and restoring an ornately styled, 3-story 1909 house in Hollywood, California and turning it into a meeting place for magicians which he called the "Magic Castle". As part of their plan to revive the Academy and locate it in the "Magic Castle", William Larsen, Jr. filed articles of incorporation and created a nonprofit corporation, in 1962. The Magic Castle opened its doors on January 2, 1963 as the home of the Academy of Magical Arts, Inc. From an initial membership of 50, the Academy has grown to a membership of over 5,000 in 2019.

Membership 

There are about 4,000 magician members in the academy today. To become a regular member, one must first be actively practicing or involved with magic as a career or hobby and audition before the academy's membership reviewing committee.

Associate members are people who love magic and the academy. Most of the members are in the entertainment business, law, finance, and medical fields. Some of these associate members are friends of magician members who enjoy the atmosphere of the academy. Associate member applications must be approved by the board of directors.

Honorary and VIP memberships are presented by the board of directors to magicians, celebrities and individual members of the academy who have contributed to the advancement of the art of magic.

It is also possible to become a junior magician if you are between the age of 13 and 20. Membership in the Junior Group is open to anyone seriously interested in magic who is from 13 to 19 years of age. One may apply if 20 years old, but must be able to be a member in the group for one full year. These junior magicians are only allowed limited use of the facilities.

Education 
The Academy of Magic offers classes that are available to the public. The Basic Magic class is designed to provide the skills and knowledge necessary to perform basic magic. The classes combines instructor presentation, step-by-step explanation, hands-on instruction, group practice sessions and individual performance.

Awards 

Performing awards are given in different categories at the annual "Academy of the Magical Arts Awards" event. Nominees for the performing awards are chosen from among that year's performers at The Magic Castle.

Other awards include various Fellowship, Merit, and Achievement awards which go to individuals who, in the view of the Academy, have made significant contributions to the field of magic.

These are the awards given by the Academy of Magical Arts:

 Magician of the Year (1968–present)
 Stage Magician of the Year (1968–present)
 Close-Up Magician of the Year (1968–present)
 Lecturer of the Year (1968–present)
 Visiting Magician of the Year (1969–present)
 Parlour Magician of the Year (1983–present)
 Comedy Magician of the Year (2003–2006)
 Bar Magician of the Year (2004–2005)

 Masters Fellowship (1968–present)
 Performing Fellowship (1968–present)
 Creative Fellowship (1968–present)
 Literary & Media Fellowship (1968–present)
 Special Fellowship (1968–present)
 Lifetime Achievement Fellowship (1985–present)
 Award of Merit (1968–present)
 Junior Achievement Award (1976–present)

Additionally, there are some other awards that have been given once or very infrequently. These include the Junior Award of Merit and Honorary Life Membership.

One of the five winners of the 1974 Award of Merit is The Magic Castle itself.

Events, television, and movies 
 The annual Soapy Smith night, in honor of the famed confidence man, takes place July 8. Proceeds go to the Dai Vernon Fund.
 Nickelodeon's Halloween special, Mystery Magical Special was filmed here in 1986.
 The Fox Halloween television special, Count DeClues' Mystery Castle, starring Max Maven was shot here in 1992.
 Portions of the 1995 horror film Lord of Illusions were set in the Magic Castle.
 Building exterior used for Matlock in 1988 for a third-season episode.
 Duran Duran held their 1984 press conference here on February 7 for their American Sing Blue Silver Tour with an estimated 150 journalists in attendance.
 A 1979 episode of the television series Quincy, M.E. entitled "The Death Challenge" includes scenes shot at The Magic Castle, and depicts the club's hidden entrance, and Irma's ghost playing the piano.
 The Monk episode, "Mr. Monk and the Magician" was shot on location in the Magic Castle. Actor and magician Steve Valentine was filmed in the theater's auditorium with Jarrad Paul and Tony Shalhoub, using his talents in the role of the evil magician Karl Torini, who murdered a friend of Monk's and became a formidable adversary.
 Neil Patrick Harris commissioned a Harry Houdini aquarium for installation at the Magic Castle in 2012. The aquarium was built by the team from the TV show Tanked. The Houdini mannequin quickly deteriorated, however, and the aquarium has since been removed from the Castle.
 NBC's 1973/74 drama The Magician featured Bill Bixby as a crime-solving stage illusionist Anthony "Tony" Blake who lived in a posh apartment at the Magic Castle.
 Scenes from the Netflix series Love episode, "Magic" were filmed and take place at the Magic Castle.
 Portions of the film Shade are filmed in the first-floor bar and outside the Parlour of Prestidigitation at The Magic Castle.
 The music video for Aimee Mann's "Patient Zero" featuring Bradley Whitford was shot almost entirely at the Magic Castle.
 The film A Night at the Magic Castle (1988) starring Arte Johnson and Matt Shakman was filmed on location inside the Magic Castle.
 The live performance of Phoebe Bridgers' "Savior Complex" on The Tonight Show Starring Jimmy Fallon was performed at the Magic Castle and accompanied by "Irma".
 In season 7, episode 2 of the Amazon Prime series, Bosch, Harry and his partner, Jerry, visit the Magic Castle in pursuit of a lead in a case that they are investigating.
 In season 6, episode 1 of the Lucifer TV series, Lucifer and Chloe visit the Magic Castle for their last planned night on earth.
 In season 12, episode 10 of The Big Bang Theory Howard looks at an old VCR recording of himself in which he auditions to be a member of the Magic Castle.

See also 
 Los Angeles Historic–Cultural Monuments in Hollywood
 Hollywood Heights, Los Angeles
 The Magic Circle (organisation) in London.

References

External links 
 
 Academy of Magical Arts (AMA)
 

Buildings and structures in Hollywood, Los Angeles
Magic clubs
Magic organizations
Culture of Hollywood, Los Angeles
Houses completed in 1909
Los Angeles Historic-Cultural Monuments
Arts organizations established in 1952
Non-profit organizations based in California